Layon Gray (born January 26, 1969) is an American playwright and director known for works about the African-American experience. His best-known work is the off-Broadway play Black Angels Over Tuskegee, about the Tuskegee airmen.

Career
A native of Louisiana, Gray writes, directs and develops stage plays and films. He focuses on creating conversational dialogue in his works, including traditional African-American theater. His play Kings Of Harlem depicts the New York Renaissance and was performed for the NBA Legends during All-Star week. This work has won several theater awards and is in development as a feature film. His work The Dahomey Warriors about the Dahomey Amazons depicts an all-female military regiment of the Kingdom of Dahomey, in the present-day Republic of Benin, which lasted until the end of the 19th century. This work was selected to perform at the 2017 National Black Theatre Festival and is in development as a television series. His play Cowboy about marshal Bass Reeves premiered in 2019 at the National Black Theatre Festival and returned for a performance in August 2022. His two man play about Redd Foxx and Richard Pryor entitled Foxx/Pryor was to begin performances in June, 2021. 

Gray has also directed plays such as: A Raisin in the Sun, A Soldiers Play, The Crucible, Before It Hits Home, For Colored Girls Who Have Considered Suicide / When The Rainbow is Enuf, Miss Evers' Boys and De Moor.

Works

References
 
 Andrew Gans (January 29, 2010)
 BWW News Desk (February 15, 2010) 
 Andrew Gans (August 25, 2010) 
 New York Times (August 26, 2010)
 African Tourism (September 20, 2010)
 Layon Gray
 BlackSparta
 Diary Of A Catholic School Dropout
 Black Angels Over Tuskegee
 The Girls Of Summer

Living people
21st-century American dramatists and playwrights
1974 births